Flávio António da Silva (born 3 April 1996) is a Portuguese professional footballer who plays as a forward for Indonesian Liga 1 side Persik Kediri.

Club career
Born in Bissau, Guinea-Bissau, Silva started his career in Portugal at Real, later joining Sporting CP and Torreense. In the 2014–15 season, Silva scored 8 goals in 11 matches for Torreense senior team in the third-tier league, before leaving the club in the winter transfer window.

On 1 February 2015, Silva signed for Portuguese champions Benfica until June 2020, being assigned to the reserve team. On 8 February, Silva debuted for Benfica B in Segunda Liga, as a substitute.

On 31 August 2015, Silva was loaned out to Covilhã for one season. On 6 January 2016, he terminated his contract with Covilhã and returned to Benfica. In February, Benfica terminated his contract.

International career
Silva plays for the Portugal under-19 team.

References

External links
 
 

1996 births
Portuguese people of Bissau-Guinean descent
Bissau-Guinean emigrants to Portugal
Living people
Sportspeople from Bissau
Portuguese footballers
Portugal youth international footballers
Association football forwards
Sporting CP footballers
Liga Portugal 2 players
Luxembourg National Division players
Liga 1 (Indonesia) players
S.L. Benfica B players
S.C. Covilhã players
C.F. União players
F.C. Alverca players
FC Mondercange players
Persik Kediri players
Portuguese expatriate footballers
Expatriate footballers in Luxembourg
Expatriate footballers in Indonesia
Portuguese expatriate sportspeople in Luxembourg
Portuguese expatriate sportspeople in Indonesia